Kamikawa Shrine (上川神社, Kamikawa jinja) is a Shinto shrine located in Asahikawa, Hokkaido. Established in 1883, it is dedicated to the kami Amaterasu (天照皇大御神), Ōkuninushi (大己貴大神), Sukunabikona no Ōkami (少彦名大神), Toyoukebime (豊受姫神), Ōmononushi (大物主神), Ame-no-Kaguyama-no-Mikoto (天乃香久山神), Takeminakata (建御名方神), Emperor Ōjin as Hondawake no Mikoto (譽田分命), and others. Its annual festival is on July 21.

See also
List of Shinto shrines in Hokkaidō

External links
Official website
Hokkaido Shinto listing

Shinto shrines in Hokkaido
1893 establishments in Japan
Tenjin faith
Beppyo shrines